Pachycereus is a genus of 9–12 species of large cacti native to Mexico and just into southern Arizona, United States. They form large shrubs or small trees up to 15 m tall, with stout stems up to 1 m in diameter.  Pachycereus comes from the ancient Greek παχύς (pachys) meaning "thick" and the Latin cereus meaning "torch".

Species

P. pringlei is the tallest cactus species in the world, with a maximum recorded height of 19.2 m.
Synonymy
These genera have been brought into synonymy with Pachycereus, although this is not always maintained:
Backebergia Bravo
Lemaireocereus Britton & Rose
Lophocereus (A.Berger) Britton & Rose
Marginatocereus (Backeb.) Backeb.
Mitrocereus (Backeb.) Backeb.
Pterocereus T.MacDoug. & Miranda

References

External links
 
 
Flora of North America: Pachycereus
Cacti Guide: Pachycereus
photos on www.AIAPS.org

 
Cactoideae genera
Flora of the Sonoran Deserts
Flora of Arizona
Flora of Northwestern Mexico
Flora of Sonora
Taxa named by Joseph Nelson Rose
Taxa named by Nathaniel Lord Britton
Taxa named by Alwin Berger